Sir William Pierce Ashe à Court, 1st Baronet (c. 1747 – 22 July 1817) was a British soldier and Member of Parliament (MP).

À Court was the son of General William Ashe-à Court and Anne Vernon. He represented Heytesbury in the House of Commons from 1781 to 1790 and again from 1806 to 1807. In 1795 he was created a Baronet, of Heytesbury in the County of Wiltshire. He was appointed Lieutenant-Colonel of the Wiltshire Militia in 1797 and High Sheriff of Wiltshire for 1812.

À Court married, firstly, Catherine Bradford, daughter of John Bradford, in 1769. In 1777 Catherine A'Court died in Cheltenham, Gloucestershire; her memorial plaque in Cheltenham's parish church suggests this was due to her having been poisoned with arsenic by a servant. The following year à Court married Laetitia Wyndham, daughter of Henry Wyndham and sister of Henry Penruddocke Wyndham, and together they had six children:

Letitia (d. 20 Jan 1810), who married William Eliot, 2nd Earl of St Germans. They had no issue.
Maria (27 November 1862), who married the Hon. Philip Pleydell-Bouverie MP. They had five children.
William (11 Jul 1779 – 31 May 1860)
Annabella (13 Feb 1781 – 27 May 1866), who married Richard Beadon, son of the Very Rev. Richard Beadon. They had four sons, and a daughter.
Vice Adm. Edward Henry à Court Repington (10 Dec 1783 – 22 Sep 1855), later an MP for Tamworth. Unmarried.
Lt.-Gen. Charles Ashe à Court Repington (17 Jun 1785 – 19 Apr 1861), who married Mary Elizabeth Catherine Gibbs, granddaughter of Sir James Douglas, Foreign Minister to Naples. together they had Elizabeth, and Charles Henry.

He died in July 1817 and was succeeded in the baronetcy by his son William, who became Lord Lieutenant of Ireland and was elevated to the peerage as Baron Heytesbury in 1828. Lady à Court died in 1821.

His granddaughter, Elizabeth (d. 1911) married in 1846 the Rt. Hon. Sidney Herbert and had seven children, including the 13th and 14th Earls of Pembroke & Montgomery.

Notes

References

Kidd, Charles, Williamson, David (editors). Debrett's Peerage and Baronetage (1990 edition). New York: St Martin's Press, 1990, 

1747 births
1817 deaths
Baronets in the Baronetage of Great Britain
Members of the Parliament of Great Britain for constituencies in Wiltshire
British MPs 1780–1784
British MPs 1784–1790
Holmes à Court family
Members of the Parliament of the United Kingdom for English constituencies
UK MPs 1806–1807
British Militia officers
High Sheriffs of Wiltshire